David Nalbandian was the defending champion, but lost to James Blake in the second round.

Radek Štěpánek won the title, defeating Gaël Monfils 6–4, 6–4, in the final.

Seeds
All seeds received a bye into the second round.

Qualifying

Draw

Finals

Top half

Section 1

Section 2

Bottom half

Section 3

Section 4

External links
 Main draw

Legg Mason Tennis Classic Singles